Rabfak (from , a syllabic abbreviation of рабочий факультет, rabochiy fakultet, "workers' faculty") was a type of educational institution in the Soviet Union which prepared Soviet workers to enter institutions of higher education.

References

See also
 Remedial education

Education in the Soviet Union